Pascale is a common Francophone given name, the feminine of the name Pascal. The same spelling is also an  Italian form of the masculine name Pascal, and an Italian surname derived from the given name.

Pascale derives from the Latin paschalis or pashalis, which means "relating to Easter", ultimately from pesach, the Hebrew name of the feast of Passover.

Notable people with the name include:

Given name
Pascale Audret
Pascale Bussières
Pascale Cossart
Pascale Criton
Pascale Dorcelus (born 1979), Canadian weightlifter
Pascale Ferran
Pascale Garaud, French-American astrophysicist
Pascale Grand
Pascale Haiti, politician and government minister from French Polynesia
Pascale Hutton
Pascale Machaalani
Pascale Montpetit
Pascale Ogier
Pascale Paradis
 Pascale Petit (actress) (born 1938), French actress
 Pascale Petit (poet) (born 1953), French poet
Pascale Quiviger
 Pascale Sablan, African-American architect
Pascale Sourisse
Pascale Trinquet

Surname

 Anie Pascale, Canadian actress
 Ernesto De Pascale, Italian journalist
 Jan Pascale, American set decorator
 Lorraine Pascale, British former model
 Ronnie Pascale, American soccer player

See also

The names Paschal, Pasqual, Pasquale, Pascal, Pascha, Pascual, Pascoe and Pasco are all masculine variations of feminine Pascale

French feminine given names
Italian-language surnames